Bin was a Chinese settlement during the Xia and Shang dynasties. It was said to be located between the Rong and Di ethnic groups. It was located at present day Xunyi County and is the modern namesake of Binzhou in Shaanxi.

Bin was the ancestral home of the Ji clan after Buzhu moved them from Tai after resigning his post in the Xia. The clan maintained control over the settlement until Ancient Duke Danfu removed them again and led his people to Zhou along the Wei River.

See also
Bin County, Shaanxi
Zhou Dynasty

References

Former populated places in China